Kolky may refer to the following places in Ukraine:

 Kolky, urban-type settlement in Manevychi Raion, Volyn Oblast
 Kolky, village in Teofipol Raion, Khmelnytskyi Oblast
 Kolky, village in Dubrovytsia Raion, Rivne Oblast